Černíkov is a municipality and village in Klatovy District in the Plzeň Region of the Czech Republic. It has about 400 inhabitants.

Administrative parts
Villages of Nevděk, Rudoltice, Slavíkovice and Vílov are administrative parts of Černíkov.

Gallery

References

Villages in Klatovy District